Waltheof was high-reeve or ealdorman of Bamburgh (fl. 994). He was probably the son of Ealdred, and the grandson of Osulf I and was father of Uhtred the Bold, Ealdorman of Northumbria. His name is Scandinavian which may imply that he had Viking ancestors.

The name 'Waltheof' remained in his family when Earl Siward married his great-granddaughter and named his son Waltheof. This son of Siward became Waltheof, Earl of Northumbria, and one of his descendants being Saint Waltheof of Melrose.

Additionally, another branch of the family would use the Waltheof name including: Waltheof of Allerdale who was son of Gospatric, Earl of Northumbria. Waltheof of Inverkeithing and Dalmeny was son of Cospatric, and grandson of Waltheof of Allerdale.  Another descendant of Gospatric, Earl of Northumbria was Waltheof, Earl of Dunbar.

In 1006 Malcolm II of Scotland invaded Northumbria and besieged the newly founded episcopal city of Durham. At that time the Danes were raiding southern England and King Æthelred was unable to send help to the Northumbrians. Ealdorman Waltheof was too old to fight and remained in his castle at Bamburgh. Ealdorman Ælfhelm of York also took no action. Waltheof's son Uhtred, acting for his father, called together an army from Bernicia and Yorkshire and led it against the Scots. The result was a decisive victory for Uhtred. Local women washed the severed heads of the Scots, receiving a payment of a cow for each, and the heads were fixed on stakes to Durham's walls. Uhtred was rewarded by King Æthelred II with the ealdormanry of Bamburgh even though his father was still alive.

Issue
Waltheof has been identified as the father of two sons, their mother is unknown:
Uhtred the Bold (also spelled Uchtred), Ealdorman of Northumbria; married several times including Ælfgifu, daughter of King Æthelred the Unready
Eadwulf Cudel, Ealdorman of Bamburgh

References

Sources
Stenton, Sir Frank M. Anglo-Saxon England; 3rd edition. Oxford University Press, 1971.

External links
 

Anglo-Saxon warriors
Rulers of Bamburgh
10th-century English people
Year of birth unknown
Year of death unknown